{|
|}

The de Havilland DH 108 "Swallow" was a British experimental aircraft designed by John Carver Meadows Frost in October 1945. The DH 108 featured a tailless, swept wing with a single vertical stabilizer, similar to the layout of the wartime German Messerschmitt Me 163 Komet. Initially designed to evaluate swept wing handling characteristics at low and high subsonic speeds for the proposed early tailless design of the Comet airliner, three examples of the DH 108 were built to Air Ministry specifications E.18/45. With the adoption of a conventional tail for the Comet, the aircraft were used instead to investigate swept wing handling up to supersonic speeds. All three prototypes were lost in fatal crashes.

Design and development
Employing the main fuselage section and engine of the de Havilland Vampire mated to a longer fuselage with a single fin and swept wings, the de Havilland DH 108 was proposed in 1944 as an aerodynamic test bed for tailless designs, particularly the DH.106 Comet which had initially been considered a tailless, swept-wing concept.  Despite the Comet design taking on more conventional features, the value of testing the unique configuration to provide basic data for the DH.110 spurred de Havilland to continue development of the DH 108. Selecting two airframes from the English Electric Vampire F 1 production line, the new aircraft had unmistakable similarities to its fighter origins, especially in the original forward fuselage which retained the nose, cockpit and other components of the Vampire. The Ministry of Supply named the DH 108 the "Swallow", a name that was never officially adopted by the company.

The new metal wing incorporating a 43˚ sweepback was approximately 15% greater in area than the standard Vampire wing. Control was based on the conventional rudder in combination with elevons that were part elevator and ailerons, fitted outboard of the split trailing edge flaps. Although the Vampire fuselage was retained, as development continued, a revised nose and streamlined, reinforced canopy were incorporated.

Testing
The first DH 108 prototype, serial number TG283, had  a 43° swept wing, flew on 15 May 1946 at RAF Woodbridge. Designed to investigate low-speed handling, it was capable of only 280 mph (450 km/h). The de Havilland chief test pilot Geoffrey de Havilland Jr., son of de Havilland company owner-designer Geoffrey de Havilland, gave a display flight in the DH 108 during the 1946 Society of British Aircraft Constructors (SBAC) airshow at Radlett. In later low-speed testing designed to clear the rear fuselage at high angles of attack, the first prototype was fitted with longer Sea Vampire landing gear.

The second, high-speed, prototype, TG306, which had a 45° swept wing incorporating automatic leading-edge Handley Page slats and was powered by a de Havilland Goblin 3 turbojet, flew soon afterwards, in June 1946. Modifications to the design included a  longer more streamlined  nose and a smaller canopy (framed by a strengthened metal fairing) facilitated by lowering the pilot's seat. While being used to evaluate handling characteristics at high speed, on 27 September 1946 TG306 suffered a catastrophic structural failure which occurred in a dive from 10,000 ft (3,050 m) at Mach 0.9 and crashed in the Thames Estuary. The pilot, Geoffrey de Havilland Jr., was killed in the accident. Early wind tunnel testing had pointed to potentially dangerous flight behaviour, but pitch oscillation at high speed had been unexpected. The subsequent accident investigation centred on a structural failure which occurred as air built up at Mach 0.9, pitching the aircraft into a shock stall that placed tremendous loads on the fuselage and wings. The main spar cracked at the roots causing the wings to immediately fold backwards.

After the loss of the second prototype, VW120 became the third and final prototype based on the newer Vampire F.5 fighter built at Hatfield. It differed from the first test aircraft in having an even more streamlined pointed nose and smaller reinforced canopy (lowering the pilot's seat allowed for a more aerodynamic canopy shape to be employed). Power-boosted elevators had been specified as a means to control the pitch oscillations at the root of the earlier disaster. A more powerful Goblin 4 of 3,738 lbf (16.67 kN) thrust had the potential to push the DH 108 into the supersonic range. VW120 first flew on 24 July 1947 flown by John Cunningham, the wartime nightfighter ace who became, in 1949, the first person to pilot the de Havilland Comet jet airliner.

Considered an important testbed for high-speed flight, VW120 was readied for an attempt at the World Speed Record then held by a Gloster Meteor at 616 mph (991 km/h). The second prototype, TG306, was a backup for the attempt before it crashed. On 12 April 1948, VW120 established a new World Air Speed Record of 604.98 mph (974.02 km/h) on a 62-mile (100 km) circuit. Then, on 6 September 1948, John Derry is thought to have probably exceeded the speed of sound in a shallow dive from 40,000 ft (12,195 m) to 30,000 ft (9,145 m). The test pilot Captain Eric "Winkle" Brown, who escaped a crash in 1949, described the DH 108 as "a killer".

In 1949, VW120 put on an aerial display at Farnborough and was placed third  in the Society of British Aircraft Constructors Challenge Trophy Air Race before being turned over to the Ministry of Supply and test flown at RAE Farnborough. It was destroyed on 15 February 1950 in a crash near Brickhill, Buckinghamshire, killing its test pilot, Squadron Leader Stuart Muller-Rowland. The accident investigation at the time pointed, not to the aircraft, but to a faulty oxygen system that incapacitated the pilot.

The coroner's report confirmed that the pilot died from a broken neck. The  failure of the left wing as the plane dived occurred just above the garage at Brickhill. This failure was presumed to be the source of a "bang" described by witnesses at Brickhill. Swishing sounds which were reported came from the aircraft spinning at a high rate due to it having only one wing. It came down in the woods, after glancing off an oak tree: traces of the impact were still visible 50 years later. The airframe and right wing were dismantled by the military, and removed very quickly. The left wing was also recovered from the fields just north of Brickhill.

A nearby German field worker ran over to the crash site and was met by the mechanic from Brickhill garage who had rushed to the crash site in his car to offer assistance. The pilot was already dead.

In 2001, a search at the crash site by a local using a metal detector was successful. He found some of the mounting bolts "cone shaped" that were removed when the remains had been dismantled on-site. The tree that the DH 108 had hit was also found, with the scar still visible. The earlier theory, that a faulty oxygen system was the cause, was ruled out by the coroner in his later report.

Finally, on 1 May 1950, during low-speed sideslip and stall tests, the first prototype, TG283, was lost in a crash at Hartley Wintney killing the pilot, Sqn Ldr George E.C. Genders AFC DFM. After abandoning the aircraft at low altitude in an inverted spin, his parachute failed to open in time. In all, 480 flights had been made by the three Swallows.

Legacy
The DH108 established a number of "firsts" for a British aircraft: it was the first British swept-winged jet aircraft and the first British tailless jet aircraft.

Operators

Royal Aircraft Establishment

Specifications (DH 108 VW120: third prototype)

See also

References

Notes

Bibliography
 Brown, Eric. "An Ill-fated Swallow... But a Harbinger of Summer". Air Enthusiast, No. 10, July–September 1979, pp. 1–7. .
Buttler, Tony and Jean-Louis Delezenne. X-Planes of Europe: Secret Research Aircraft from the Golden Age 1946-1974. Manchester, UK: Hikoki Publications, 2015. 
 Davies, R.E.G. and Philip J. Birtles. Comet: The World's First Jet Airliner. McLean, Virginia: Paladwr Press, 1999. .
 Jackson, A.J. de Havilland Aircraft Since 1915. London: Putnam, 1962. No ISBN.
 McPhee, Andrew.  "Weird Wings – de Havilland DH.108." Unreal Aircraft.. Retrieved: 4 September 2005.
 Pelletier, Alain J. "Towards the Ideal Aircraft: The Life and Times of the Flying Wing, Part Two". Air Enthusiast, No. 65, September–October 1996, pp. 8–19. .
 Rivas, Brian. A Very British Sound Barrier: DH108, A Story of Courage, Triumph and Tragedy. Walton on Thames, UK: Red Kite, 2012. .
 Watkins, David. de Havilland Vampire: The Complete History. Thrupp, Stroud, UK: Budding Books, 1996. .
 Winchester, Jim. Concept Aircraft: Prototypes, X-Planes and Experimental Aircraft. Kent, UK: Grange Books plc., 2005. .

External links

 Description of the three aircraft at Jets45
 The Brickhill crash of VW120  
 Web archive of British Aircraft Directory listing for DH. 108
 "The D.H. 108 – The Last Photographs of the Machine on Which Geoffrey de Havilland Lost His Life,"  Flight article on de Havilland's death

1940s British experimental aircraft
DH 108
Tailless aircraft
Single-engined jet aircraft
Mid-wing aircraft
Aircraft first flown in 1946